The City of West Torrens is a local government area in the western suburbs of Adelaide, South Australia. Since the 1970s the area was mainly home to many open spaces and parks, however after the mid-1990s (1993-1995) the LGA became more residential.

History

It was established on 7 July 1853 as the District Council of West Torrens, which was one of the first local governments to be formed in South Australia following the passage of the District Councils Act 1852. It became smaller over time as a number of areas within the original boundaries split off to form new municipalities: the Holdfast Bay area became part of the new Corporate Town of Glenelg on 23 August 1855, the Thebarton area seceded as the Corporate Town of Thebarton on 8 February 1883, and the West Beach area seceded as part of the Corporate Town of Henley and Grange on 4 December 1915. It gained an area from the District Council of Marion on 15 January 1903, but subsequently lost the same area to the Glenelg council. Further areas of West Torrens were severed and added to Glenelg in 1928, 1932 and 1950.

It became a municipal corporation as the Corporate Town of West Torrens on 1 January 1944, and gained city status as the City of West Torrens on 1 July 1950. It absorbed the former Corporate Town of Thebarton on 1 March 1997, briefly being renamed the City of West Torrens Thebarton before reverting to its original name several months later.

Council

The current council  is:

Suburbs
The City of West Torrens contains the following suburbs.

 Adelaide Airport
 Ashford
 Brooklyn Park
 Camden Park
 Cowandilla
 Fulham
 Glandore
 Glenelg North
 Hilton
 Keswick
 Keswick Terminal
 Kurralta Park
 Lockleys
 Marleston
 Mile End
 Mile End South
 Netley
 North Plympton
 Novar Gardens
 Plympton
 Richmond
 Thebarton
 Torrensville
 Underdale
 West Richmond
 West Beach

Mayors (formerly Chairmen) of West Torrens

 Alexander Ferris Scott (1935-1937) 
 Alfred Burt (1937-1939) 
 Arthur McLean (1939-1940) 
 Hurtle Henry Norman (1940-1941) 
 Howard Edward Comley (1941-1946) 
 Charles Richard John Veale (1946-1954) 
 Robert James Bartlett (1954-1961) 
 Stephen John (Steve) Hamra (1961-1976) 
 Reece Jennings (1976-1977) 
 Stephen John (Steve) Hamra (1976-1989) 
 George Robertson (1989-1998) 
 Reece Jennings (1999-2000) 
 John Trainer (2000-2018) 
 Michael Coxon (2018-present)

See also
 List of Adelaide parks and gardens

References

External links
City of West Torrens website
City of West Torrens community profile

West Torrens
West Torrens